Bradley Williams (born 25 July 1994) is a South African cricketer. He made his List A debut for Border in the 2016–17 CSA Provincial One-Day Challenge on 8 January 2017. He made his first-class debut for Border in the 2016–17 Sunfoil 3-Day Cup on 9 March 2017.

References

External links
 

1994 births
Living people
South African cricketers
Border cricketers
Cricketers from Port Elizabeth